Surkhakhi (Surkhote; Сурхо-Хитӏе, Surkho-Khite) is a rural locality (a selo) in Nazranovsky District of the Republic of Ingushetia, Russia. It forms the municipality of the rural settlement of Surkhakhi as the only settlement in its composition.

Geography 
The village is located on the left bank of the Kench River, 9 km southeast of the regional center - the city of Nazran and 9 km northeast of the city of Magas .

History 
The village of Surkhakhi was founded in 1836. According to one of the official versions, on the territory, including the village of Surkhakhi, there was the ancient city of Magas — the capital of the medieval polyethnic state of Alania, which also included the territory of modern Ingushetia. In this version, we are talking about the complex of ancient settlements "Yandare - Gazi-Yurt - Ekazhevo - Ali-Yurt - Surkhakhi", which are a single fortified area of early medieval fortresses and many settlements between them. More than 30 settlements, numerous settlements, connecting them with defensive ditches and funerary monuments of the Alanian period were recorded in this area.

In July 1919, when Ingushetia was under the rule of Denikin's forces and the people of Surkhakhi left the village, Mandre Nalgiev with his mother remained in the village. Mandre defended Surkhakhi for 9 days, coming out victorious as the Ingush militants came for help and libarated the village. The villagers also attacked and disarmed a White Guard echelon in Nazran. To suppress the uprising, the command of the volunteer army was forced to withdraw 15 thousand bayonets from the front. In 1927, the chairman of the All-Russian Central Executive Committee, M. I. Kalinin, presented the villagers with a letter of thanks for their active support of the Red Army.

From 1944 to 1958, during the period of the deportation of Chechens and Ingush and the abolition of the Chechen-Ingush ASSR, the village was called Mamison.

Archeological finds 
To date, directly in Surkhakhi, archaeologists have found and recorded: 1.5 km west of the village "Surkhahin settlement No. 1" — "Khatoy boarz", 1.7 km west of the village, 200 meters "near an artificial pond in the Erz-Eli tract — "Surkhakhinsky settlement No. 2", 50 m from it "Surkhakhinsky settlement No. 3", 1.5-2 km north-west of the village on the left bank of the Kench River Surkhakhinsky settlement No. 4" — "Ters vakha chu", 1 km to the east of the village "Surkhakhinsky settlement No. 5, to the south-west of the village "Surkhakhinsky settlement No. 6, to the west of the village "Surkhahinsk settlement No. 7" — "Arapkha boarzash", 1.5 km south-east of the village "Surkhakhinskoe settlement No. 8" — "Daka am Kerte", 2.5 km south-west of the village "Surkhahinskoe settlement No. 9" - "Khoriy bose", part of the village near the former farm "Surkhakhinsky settlement No. 10" — "Ehka boarz", 3-4 km southeast of the village "Surkhakha settlement No. 11" — "Shin ken duk".

Notable people 
 Mandre Nalgiev — Ingush sniper and avenger.

References

Bibliography 
 
 
 
 
 

Rural localities in Ingushetia